Dhaan Gali is a village in Samote Union Council of Kallar Syedan Tehsil, Rawalpindi District in the Punjab Province of Pakistan.

Schools in Dhaan Gali 
 Government Elementary School Dhaan Gali 

Populated places in Kallar Syedan Tehsil
Villages in Samote union council